Ōtewā is a rural community in the Ōtorohanga District and Waikato region of New Zealand's North Island.

The local Ōtewā Pā is a marae of the Ngāti Maniapoto hapū of Ngāti Matakore, Ngutu, Parewaeono, Rereahu, Te Kanawa and Urunumia. It includes Ko Te Hokingamai ki te Nehenehenui wharenui.

Education

Ōtewā School is a Year 1–8 co-educational state primary school.

Notable people 

 Kepa Hamuera Anaha Ehau (1885 – 1970): tribal leader, law clerk, interpreter, soldier, historian, orator

References

Ōtorohanga District
Populated places in Waikato